Anandamay Barman is an Indian politician from Bharatiya Janata Party. In May 2021, he was elected as a member of the West Bengal Legislative Assembly from Matigara-Naxalbari (constituency). He defeated Rajen Sundas of All India Trinamool Congress by 70,848 votes in 2021 West Bengal Assembly election. He is now the President of Siliguri organization district BJP.

References 

Living people
21st-century Indian politicians
People from Darjeeling district
Bharatiya Janata Party politicians from West Bengal
West Bengal MLAs 2021–2026
1982 births